Roi Et Hospital is the main hospital of Roi Et Province, Thailand. It is classified under the Ministry of Public Health as a regional hospital. It has a CPIRD Medical Education Center which trains doctors for the Faculty of Medicine of Mahasarakham University.

History 
The foundation stone of Roi Et Hospital was laid on 5 September 1940 on the grounds of the Old Suea Pa Club. The building was completed and opened to the public on 24 June 1941. In 2009, the hospital made an agreement to train medical students and act as a clinical teaching hospital for the Faculty of Medicine, Mahasarakham University under the Collaborative Project to Increase Production of Rural Doctors (CPIRD) program.

See also 

 Healthcare in Thailand
 Hospitals in Thailand
 List of hospitals in Thailand

References 

 Article incorporates material from the corresponding article in the Thai Wikipedia.

Hospitals in Thailand
Roi Et province